Liptena perobscura is a butterfly in the family Lycaenidae. It was first described by Hamilton Herbert Druce in 1910. It is found in Cameroon and the Republic of the Congo.

References

Butterflies described in 1910
Liptena